Semalka Border Crossing, is a border crossing established between the Kurdistan Regional Government in Iraq and the Kurdish-led Autonomous Administration of North and East Syria during the Syrian Civil War about 1 km downstream from the Iraqi–Syrian–Turkish tripoint and just north of Faysh Khabur in Iraq and Khanik in Syria consisting of a pontoon bridge across the Tigris.

The border crossing has been intermittently closed by the Kurdistan Regional Government (KRG), but has been open permanently since June 2016, and economic exchange has since then begun to normalize between Northeastern Syria and the Kurdistan Region.

See also 
Faysh Khabur
Khanik

References

Iraq–Syria border crossings